Aleksandr Sergeyevich Shcherbakov (born 26 June 1998) is a Russian professional football player who plays as a right winger for Sokol Saratov.

Club career
He made his professional debut on 19 March 2016 for Ural in a Russian Football Premier League game against Terek Grozny.

On 11 February 2018, he joined the Armenian club Alashkert on loan.

References

External links
 

1998 births
People from Polevskoy
Sportspeople from Sverdlovsk Oblast
Living people
Russian footballers
Russia youth international footballers
Association football midfielders
FC Ural Yekaterinburg players
FC Alashkert players
Enosis Neon Paralimni FC players
FC Sokol Saratov players
Russian Premier League players
Armenian First League players
Cypriot First Division players
Russian Second League players
Russian expatriate footballers
Expatriate footballers in Armenia
Russian expatriate sportspeople in Armenia
Expatriate footballers in Cyprus
Russian expatriate sportspeople in Cyprus